Diploschema rotundicolle, citrus stem borer is a species of beetle in the family Cerambycidae. It was described by Audinet-Serville in 1834. The species is known for feeding on oranges in Brazil.

References

Torneutini
Beetles described in 1834